Economic Geology is a peer-reviewed scientific journal about economic geologies published by the Economic Geology Publishing Company from 1905 until 2001, when the company merged with the Society of Economic Geologists (SEG). The Publications Board of the SEG now manages the journal.

References

External links 
 

Economics journals
Geology journals
English-language journals
Economic geology
Mining journals
Publications established in 1905
Resource economics
1905 establishments in the United States